Brigadier Ronald Joseph Callender Broadhurst (1906–1976) was a Unionist politician in Northern Ireland.

In the 1973 Northern Ireland Assembly election, he was the last of seven MPAs elected in the South Down constituency, as a pro-Sunningdale candidate. He became the Deputy Speaker of the Assembly.

Also in 1973, Broadhurst appeared on Ulster Television demanding that the New University of Ulster (now the University of Ulster at Coleraine) be closed down, a request he also made in the Assembly, to no effect. As a supporter of Brian Faulkner, he followed Faulkner into the newly formed Unionist Party of Northern Ireland in 1974 and stood for the party in South Down in the Northern Ireland Constitutional Convention election of 1975 but failed to get elected.

An Arabist, in 1952 he authored a translation of The Travels of Ibn Jubayr from Arabic.

His papers are held in the Public Records Office of Northern Ireland in Belfast and also in St Antony's College, Oxford.

References

 

1906 births
1976 deaths
British radio personalities
Members of the Northern Ireland Assembly 1973–1974
North Irish Horse officers
Ulster Unionist Party politicians
Unionist Party of Northern Ireland politicians